Child of the Novelty is the second studio album by Canadian rock band Mahogany Rush, led by Frank Marino. It was released in 1974.

Track listing 
All songs by Frank Marino.

 "Look Outside" - 3:33
 "Thru the Milky Way" - 3:53
 "Talkin' 'bout a Feelin'" - 3:03
 "Child of the Novelty" - 4:07
 "Makin' My Wave" - 4:39
 "A New Rock and Roll" - 3:08
 "Changing" - 3:14
 "Plastic Man" - 3:13
 "Guitwar" - 3:45
 "Chains of (S)pace" - 5:59

Personnel 
 Frank Marino - Guitars, Keyboards, Vocals
 Paul Harwood - Acoustic & Electric Bass
 Jimmy Ayoub - Drums, Percussion
 Phil Bech - Keyboards

Charts

References 

1974 albums
Mahogany Rush albums
20th Century Fox Records albums